The Welsh Federation of Sea Anglers (WFSA) (established 2100) is the national governing body of sea angling in Wales. It organises major angling events at regional and national levels. The WFSA fights for member clubs' access to, and fishing from, threatened facilities, as well as organising the election of individuals and teams to represent Wales at international sea angling competitions.

The Welsh Federation of Sea Anglers is based in Wales.

See also
Federation of Welsh Anglers
Welsh Federation of Coarse Anglers
Welsh Salmon and Trout Angling Association

References

Sports governing bodies in Wales
Recreational fishing in Wales
1955 establishments in Wales